Reilly Township is a township in Schuylkill County, Pennsylvania, United States. The population was 641 at the 2020 census.

Geography
According to the United States Census Bureau, the township has a total area of 16.3 square miles (42.1 km), of which 16.2 square miles (42.0 km)  is land and 0.04 square mile (0.1 km)  (0.18%) is water.

Demographics

At the 2000 census there were 802 people, 326 households, and 213 families living in the township.  The population density was 49.4 people per square mile (19.1/km).  There were 355 housing units at an average density of 21.9/sq mi (8.4/km).  The racial makeup of the township was 99.63% White, and 0.37% from two or more races. Hispanic or Latino of any race were 0.25%.

Of the 326 households 29.8% had children under the age of 18 living with them, 53.7% were married couples living together, 9.2% had a female householder with no husband present, and 34.4% were non-families. 29.1% of households were one person and 17.5% were one person aged 65 or older.  The average household size was 2.46 and the average family size was 3.07.

The age distribution was 24.8% under the age of 18, 6.9% from 18 to 24, 29.6% from 25 to 44, 19.6% from 45 to 64, and 19.2% 65 or older.  The median age was 38 years. For every 100 females, there were 94.2 males.  For every 100 females age 18 and over, there were 92.7 males.

The median household income was $28,646 and the median family income  was $40,500. Males had a median income of $31,667 versus $21,094 for females. The per capita income for the township was $13,888.  About 5.8% of families and 10.6% of the population were below the poverty line, including 17.9% of those under age 18 and 7.6% of those age 65 or over.

References

Townships in Schuylkill County, Pennsylvania
Townships in Pennsylvania